Air vice-marshal Tanveer Ashraf Bhatti, Sitara-i-Imtiaz, is in the Pakistan Air Force serving as the Additional Director general of the Pakistan Civil Aviation Authority since 4 July 2018. He was commissioned in the GD (P) Branch of the Pakistan Air Force in December 1988. He holds a master's degree in “National Security & War Studies". He is a graduate of the Combat Commander's School, Air War College and the National Defence University. He has been awarded the Sitara-i-Imtiaz (Military).

Commands

Awards and decorations

References 

1967 births
Living people
Pakistan Air Force officers
Pakistani chief executives